Introducing The Style Council is a mini-LP by English band the Style Council, released in 1983. Their debut release, it was released only in Australia, New Zealand, Canada, the United States, Japan, and the Netherlands. Though not officially released in the United Kingdom, the Dutch release was heavily imported.

Introducing The Style Council includes tracks from the band's first three UK single releases, as well as the club mix version of "Long Hot Summer". The band's official, full-length studio album, Café Bleu, was released the following year.

Track listing

Personnel
 Paul Weller – vocals, guitar, production
 Mick Talbot – keyboards
 Zeke Manyika – drums
 Steve White – drums
 Tracie Young – backing vocals
 Peter Wilson – production
 Bert Bevans – remixing (tracks 4 and 7)

Charts

References

External links
 

1983 debut EPs
The Style Council albums
Polydor Records EPs